Transmisogyny, otherwise known as trans-misogyny and transphobic misogyny, is the intersection of transphobia and misogyny as experienced by trans women and transfeminine people. The term was coined by Julia Serano in her 2007 book Whipping Girl to describe a particular form of oppression experienced by trans women. In an interview with the New York Times, Serano explores the roots of transmisogyny as a critique of feminine gender expressions which are "ridiculed in comparison to masculine interests and gender expression." 

Transmisogyny is a central concept in transfeminism and is commonly referenced in intersectional feminist theory. In her definition of transmisogyny, Serano does not limit those affected by transmisogyny to individuals who identify as transgender and includes those who identify as drag queens.

Framework
The concept of transmisogyny hinges on two other concepts first described by Serano: traditional sexism and oppositional sexism. The former is the idea that "maleness and masculinity are superior to femaleness and femininity", while the latter holds male and female as "rigid, mutually exclusive categories". Transmisogyny stems from both these concepts. 

In Whipping Girl, Julia Serano writes that the existence of trans women is seen as a threat to a "male-centered gender hierarchy". Gender theorist Judith Butler echoes this assumption, stating that the murder of transgender women by men is "the most toxic form that masculinity can take", a way for the killer to assert power over the victim in the instant, in response to the idea of the intrinsic nature of his power (ie, his masculinity) being threatened. Butler states that trans women have relinquished masculinity, showing that it is possible to do so.

Instances

United States
Transgender women face harsher levels of discrimination than other transgender people. A study on workplace experiences after people receive sex changes found that trans women, on average, lose almost one third of their salary, are respected less, and receive more harassment. At the same time, trans men often experience salary raises and greater authority in the workplace.

According to Laura Kacere (2014), trans people experience a disproportionately large number of hate crimes, with trans women experiencing the majority of these crimes. The National Coalition of Anti-Violence Programs (2012) found that police violence is three times higher against transgender people than it is against cisgender people. In fact, over half of all anti-LGBTQIA+ homicides were perpetrated against transgender women. In the United States, the majority of transmisogyny is directed at trans women of color. The Human Rights Campaign Foundation (2018) reports significant overlaps between the gender identity and race of anti-trans violence victims: of the known homicides of transgender people from 2013 to 2018, approximately 92% were trans women, and approximately 70% were black. Kacere (2014) also states that 21% of transgender women and 47% of black transgender women have experienced incarceration, rates that are much higher than those for the overall U.S. population.

Ecuador
A study on discrimination of lesbian, bisexual, transsexual, transgender and intersex women in Ecuador found that transgender women "lack protection against discrimination in both law and practice." As a result, trans women have faced violence, sexual abuse, and discrimination in educational, health and workforce institutions.

Sexualization and harassment 

Julia Serano has stated that many trans women experience an additional layer of misogyny in the form of fetishization. She notes that, despite transitioning, trans women are still commonly perceived as male; however, they are rarely sexualized as such. In the porn industry, whose target audience is primarily heterosexual men, trans women are largely presented as sexual objects rather than "predatory". 

According to Serano, the sexualisation of trans women is not solely because transgender women, by nature of their relative rarity, are viewed as "exotic": she notes that trans women are sexualized particularly much even compared to other types of "rare" women. In Whipping Girl, Serano writes on what she calls a "predator–prey dichotomy" where "men are invariably viewed as predators and women as prey." Because of this view, trans women are perceived to be luring men by transitioning and "turning [themselves] into sexual objects that no red-blooded man can resist."

Transmisogynistic violence and harassment directed towards trans feminine individuals is often perpetrated by strangers rather than those known by the victim and oftentimes includes catcalling and other forms of verbal abuse. Although some states have non-discrimination laws protecting transgender individuals, there is no federal law specifically designed to protect those who identify as transgender.

Relation to transphobia
Transmisogyny is a distinct category of transphobia in that transmisogyny mainly focuses on trans women and other transgender individuals who demonstrate femininity, whereas transphobia is a more general term, covering a broader spectrum of prejudice and discrimination towards transsexual and transgender individuals.  Julia Serano states in Whipping Girl that "[w]hen the majority of jokes made at the expense of trans people center on 'men wearing dresses' or 'men who want their penises cut off' that is not transphobia – it is transmisogyny. When the majority of violence and sexual assaults committed against trans people is directed at trans women, that is not transphobia – it is transmisogyny."

Serano gives an example of the discrimination that trans feminine individuals experience and how it differs from the experience of a trans masculine individual in a New York Times interview,

Transmisogyny and mental health 
Negative attitudes and aggression that cisgender people hold towards transgender people can lead to microaggressions and discrimination. When a trans individual encounters these microaggressions and discrimination, it can harm their mental and physical health. Research has shown a significant amount of differences in mental health concerns amongst trans, gender diverse, and gender nonconforming children compared to other cisgender youth.   Gender-based discrimination and aggression have lead to an increase in suicide and suicide attempts among trans youth. These adverse outcomes do not just arise from their peers, but the discrimination is also a systemic problem, such as school bathroom policies and denied access to hormones. Continued subjection to inequity and prejudice creates an unsafe social environment for transgender people.

References

External links

2000s neologisms
Misogyny
Transphobia
Transgender studies
Violence against women
LGBT and society
Anti-LGBT sentiment